Utopia is the third studio album by Australian rapper 360. It was released on 13 June 2014. It features four singles; "Impossible" featuring Daniel Johns, "Sixavelli" which features rapper Lunar C, "Live It Up" which features Australian rapper Pez and "Price of Fame" which features singer Gossling.

Background
In June 2012, 360 revealed to national youth broadcaster Triple J that he was already working on his third album.

Singles
"Impossible" featuring Daniel Johns was released 1 January 2014.
"Sixavelli" featuring Lunar C was released 27 March 2014.
"Live It Up" featuring PEZ was released 3 April 2014.
"Price of Fame" featuring Gossling was released 9 June 2014.

Track listing

Charts

Weekly charts

Year-end charts

References

2014 albums
360 (rapper) albums